At the End of the Evening is a studio album by Nightnoise. The album was released by Windham Hill Records (WD-1076) in 1988.

Track listing 

 "Windell" by Billy Oskay and Mícheál Ó Domhnaill (3:47)   
 "Of a Summer Morn" by Mícheál Ó Domhnaill (3:21)   
 "Hugh" by Tríona Ní Dhomhnaill (3:39)   
 "Jaunting" by Brian Dunning (3:35)   
 "The Courtyard" by Billy Oskay (2:48)   
 "'Bring Me Back A Song.'" by Mícheál Ó Domhnaill (4:50)   
 "Snow on High Ground" by Tríona Ní Dhomhnaill (3:43)   
 "At the Races" by Tríona Ní Dhomhnaill (3:06)   
 "Forgotten Carnival" by Brian Dunning (3:30)   
 "The Cuillin Hills" by Tríona Ní Dhomhnaill (2:47)   
 "Her Kansas Sun" by Billy Oskay (3:35)   
 "End of the Evening" by Tríona Ní Dhomhnaill (5:06)   
 "The Swan" by Mícheál Ó Domhnaill (3:17)

Credits 

 Billy Oskay – violin, viola, keyboards, engineer
 Mícheál Ó Domhnaill – guitar, keyboards, whistle
 Tríona Ní Dhomhnaill – keyboards, Whistle, accordion, vocals
 Brian Dunning – flute, panpipes 
 Nightnoise – producer
 Bernie Grundman – mastering 
 Anne Robinson – art direction, artwork
 Candace Upman – graphic design 
 John Helyar – photography (booklet) 
 Carl Studna – photography (Cover)

References 

1988 albums
Nightnoise albums